August Hermann Francke (22 March 1663 – 8 June 1727) was a German Lutheran clergyman, theologian, philanthropist, and Biblical scholar.

Biography
Born in Lübeck, Francke was educated at the Illustrious Gymnasium in Gotha before he studied at the universities of Erfurt and Kiel — where he came under the influence of the Pietist Christian Kortholt — and finally Leipzig. During his student career he made a special study of Hebrew and Greek; and in order to learn Hebrew more thoroughly, he for some time put himself under the instructions of Ezra Edzardi at Hamburg. He graduated at Leipzig, where in 1685 he became a Privatdozent.

A year later, by the help of his friend P. Anton, and with the approval and encouragement of Philipp Jakob Spener, he founded the Collegium Philobiblicum, at which a number of graduates met regularly for the systematic study of the Bible, philologically and practically. He next spent some months at Lüneburg as assistant or curate to the learned superintendent, K. H. Sandhagen, and there his religious beliefs deepened. On leaving Lüneburg he spent some time in Hamburg, where he became a teacher in a private school, and made the acquaintance of Nikolaus Lange.

After a long visit to Spener, at that time a court preacher in Dresden, Francke returned to Leipzig in the spring of 1689, and began to give Bible lectures of an exegetical and practical kind, at the same time resuming the Collegium Philobiblicum of earlier days. He soon became popular as a lecturer; but the peculiarities of his teaching almost immediately aroused a violent opposition on the part of the university authorities; and before the end of the year he was interdicted from lecturing on the ground of his alleged Pietism.  That was how Francke's name first came to be publicly associated with that of Spener, and with Pietism. Prohibited from lecturing in Leipzig, Francke in 1690 found work at Erfurt as "deacon" of one of the city churches. Here his evangelistic fervour attracted multitudes to his preaching, including Roman Catholics, but at the same time excited the anger of his opponents; and the result of their opposition was that after a ministry of fifteen months he was commanded by the civil authorities (27 September 1691) to leave Erfurt within forty-eight hours.  That same year Spener was expelled from Dresden.

In December, through Spener's influence, Francke accepted an invitation to fill the chair of Greek and oriental languages in the new University of Halle, which was at that time being organized by the elector Frederick III of Brandenburg; and at the same time, the chair having no salary attached to it, he was appointed pastor of Glaucha in the immediate neighbourhood of the town. He afterwards became professor of theology. Here, for the remaining thirty-six years of his life, he discharged the twofold office of pastor and professor with energy and success.

At the very outset of his labours, he had been profoundly impressed with a sense of his responsibility towards the numerous outcast children who were growing up around him in ignorance and crime. After a number of tentative plans, he resolved in 1695 to institute what is often called a "ragged school," supported by public charity. A single room was at first sufficient, but within a year it was found necessary to purchase a house, to which another was added in 1697.

In 1698, there were 100 orphans under his charge to be clothed and fed, besides 500 children who were taught as day scholars. The schools grew in importance and were later known as the Franckesche Stiftungen. The education given was strictly religious. Hebrew was included, while the Greek and Latin classics were neglected; the Homilies of Macarius took the place of Thucydides. A chemist, whom Francke had visited on his deathbed, bequeathed to him the recipe for compounding certain medicines, which afterwards yielded an annual income of more than $20,000, and made the institution independent. Shortly after its founding, the institution comprised an orphan asylum, a Latin school, a German (or burgher) school, and a seminary for training teachers for these establishments. Although Francke's principal aim was religious instruction, he also taught natural science and physical exercises and manual trades. He ran an apothecary's shop and, having assisted his friend Carl Hildebrand von Canstein in founding the first modern Bible society, a printing press for publishing cheap copies of the Bible for mass distribution. At the time of Francke's death, the schools were frequented by more than 2,300 pupils. Francke's schools provided a prototype which greatly influenced later German education.

In his university teaching as well, he gave great emphasis to religion. Even as professor of Greek, he had given great prominence in his lectures to the study of the Scriptures; but he found a much more congenial sphere when, in 1698, he was appointed to the chair of theology. Yet his first courses of lectures in that department were readings and expositions of the Old and New Testament; and to this, as also to hermeneutics, he always attached special importance, believing that for theology a sound exegesis was the one indispensable requisite. "Theologus nascitur in scripturis," he used to say; but during his occupancy of the theological chair he lectured at various times upon other branches of theology also. Amongst his colleagues were Paul Anton, Joachim J. Breithaupt,  Joachim Lange and Johann Juncker—men who shared his beliefs. Through their influence upon the students, Halle became a centre from which Pietism became very widely diffused over Germany. Under Francke's influence, Christian missionary efforts were greatly enhanced, zeal was aroused and recruits for Christian missions were gained, and Halle also became the centre for the Danish-Halle Mission to India.

Works
The Manuductio was translated into English in 1813, under the title A Guide to the Reading and Study of the Holy Scriptures.

An account of his orphanage, entitled , (1709), which subsequently passed through several editions, has also been partially translated, under the title The Footsteps of Divine Providence, or, The Bountiful Hand of Heaven Defraying the Expenses of Faith.

Francke, August Hermann (1704): August Hermann Franckes Schrift über eine Reform des Erziehungs- und Bildungswesens als Ausgangspunkt einer geistlichen und sozialen Neuordnung der Evangelischen Kirche des 18. Jahrhunderts: der Grosse Aufsatz. Mit einer quellenkundlichen Einführung. Hrsg. v. Otto Podczeck. Berlin. Akademie 1962.

Notes

References
 

 .

Brigitte Klosterberg: "The “Mission Archives” in the Archives of the Francke Foundations in Halle." in: MIDA Archival Reflexicon (2020), ISSN 2628-5029, 9 pp.

Attribution

Further reading
Sattler, Gary R. (1982). God's Glory, Neighbor's Good: A brief introduction to the life and writings of August Hermann Francke. Chicago: Covenant Press. .
Yoder, Peter James (2021). Pietism and the Sacraments: The Life and Theology of August Hermann Francke. University Park: Pennsylvania State University Press. .

External links

 Augustus Hermann Francke Christ the sum and substance of all the Holy Scriptures, in the Old and New Testament Published 1732
 Augustus Hermann Francke Nicodemus, or, A treatise against the fear of man Published 1831
Augustus Hermann Francke A guide to the reading and study of the Holy Scriptures Published 1823
Heinrich Ernst Ferdinand Guericke, 1803-1878 Life of Augustus Herman Franke Published 1847
Memoirs of Augustus Hermann Francke by American Sunday-School Union 1831

1663 births
1727 deaths
Clergy from Lübeck
German Lutheran theologians
17th-century Latin-language writers
18th-century Latin-language writers
18th-century German male writers
17th-century Lutherans
18th-century Lutherans
Christian Hebraists
People from the Duchy of Magdeburg
18th-century German Protestant theologians
German male non-fiction writers
Georgia Salzburgers
Pietists
17th-century Lutheran theologians
18th-century Lutheran theologians